Chromosome 13 Open Reading Frame 46 is a protein which in humans is encoded by the C13orf46 gene. In humans, C13orf46 is ubiquitously expressed at low levels in tissues, including the lungs, stomach, prostate, spleen, and thymus. This gene encodes eight alternatively spliced mRNA transcript, which produce five different protein isoforms.

Gene 
An alternative name for C13orf46 is LOC100507747. C13orf46 spans 47,563 base pairs, contains 11 exons, and is on the minus strand of chromosome 13 at 13q34.

Gene neighbors
The neighboring genes around C13orf46 include LINC00454, LINC00452, SWINGN, RASA3, and LOC124903221.

LINC00454 and LINC00452 (Long Intergenic NonProtein Coding RNA 454 & 452) are both long non-coding RNAs (lncRNA) that regulate epigenetic gene expression, chromatin remodeling, and levels of gene transcription and translation. Both LINC00454 and LINC00452 expression are restricted to the testis. LINC00454 has been associated with Factor X Deficiency while LINC00452 has been found to promote ovarian carcinogenesis.

SWINGN (SWI/SNF Complex Interacting GAS6 Enhancer Non-Coding RNA) is also a lncRNA that neighbors C13orf46. SWINGN regulates the activation of the GAS6 (Growth Arrest Specific 6) oncogene, by interacting with matrix associated and actin dependent regulators of chromatin.

The RASA3 (RAS p21 Protein Activator 3) gene encodes the Ras GTPase activating protein. This protein binds inositol 1,3,4,5-tetrakisphosphate to stimulate the activity of Ras p21 and negatively regulates the Ras signaling pathway. RASA3 is most highly expressed in fat, lymph nodes, and the spleen. The encoded protein is localized to the cell membrane.

mRNA 
Eight different transcript variants have been identified for C13orf46. These transcript variants are alternatively spliced to include variations of 11 different exons. Depending on the different transcript variant that is translated, 5 different possible protein isoforms are encoded by C13orf46. The most common protein product encoded by C13orf46 is isoform 1, which is 212 amino acids long.

Protein 
The primary protein isoform of the C13orf46 gene consists of 212 amino acids. The longest encoded isoform, known as C13orf46 protein isoform X1, is 624 amino acids long. Other protein isoforms encoded by the C13orf46 gene are similar to either of these two versions of the C13orf46 protein. Varying forms of the primary 212 amino acid protein is encoded by transcript variants 1, X5, X6, and X7. Variations of the longest C13orf46 protein isoform are encoded by transcript variants X1, X2, X3, and X4.

Protein isoform 1

Properties and composition 
C13orf46 Isoform 1 has a theoretical isoelectric point of 4.84 and a predicted molecular weight of 23.4 kDA. Higher relative amounts of glutamic acid (15.1%) and aspartic acid (7.5%) are found within this isoform, while the amino acids phenylalanine (0.9%) and threonine (0.5%) are found to be less abundant within the protein composition. C13orf46 Isoform 1 also has a glutamic acid rich region where multiple glutamic acid and lysine doublets are present, some of which occur side by side. A total of 14 multiplets are found within the protein overall, 12 of which are charged. C13orf46 Isoform 1 is not predicted to contain any charge clusters, hydrophobic segments, or transmembrane segments.

Structure 

C13orf46 Protein Isoform 1 is predicted to consist of 7 alpha helices and 2 beta strands in addition to regions of random free coils.

Domains and motifs 
C13orf46 Isoform 1 has two identified disordered regions spanning between amino acid residues 1 through 148 and 168 to 190. In addition, C13orf46 Isoform 1 has a glutamic acid rich region spanning along amino acid residues 109 to 191.

Regulation and post translational modifications 
C13orf46 Isoform 1 is predicted to undergo several post-translational modifications such as phosphorylation, O-GlcNAcylation, mucin type GalNAc O-glycosylation, palmitoylation, and sumoylation. PKA, PKC, CKII, PKG, GSK3, cdc2, RSK, and ATM are kinases that are predicted to bind and phosphorylate the human C13orf46 Isoform 1. There is also one predicted phosphoprotein-binding phosphosite on the protein.

Protein isoform X1

Properties 
C13orf46 Isoform X1 has a theoretical isoelectric point of 9.33 and a predicted molecular weight of 66.7 kDA. C13orf46 Isoform X1 protein contains much higher relative amounts of serine (18.4%) and leucine (18.8%) compared to other human proteins and also has high amounts of proline (14.4%). Roughly equal amounts of serine and leucine are found within the protein. C13orf46 Isoform X1 protein is also composed of lower than usual amounts of glutamic acid (1.3%), phenylalanine (0.3%), and lysine (0.5%) and also has low amounts of valine (2.4%). Asparagine is not found within the C13orf46 Isoform X1 protein. Within this isoform, 100 amino acid multiplets are found, 5 of which are charged. No charge clusters, hydrophobic segments or transmembrane domains are predicted within the protein.

Structure   

C13orf46 Isoform X1 is predicted to consist of a combination of alpha helices, beta sheets, and free random coil regions. There are 22 predicted alpha helices and 18 predicted beta sheets within the predicted structure of C13orf46 Isoform X1.   

   

C13orf46 Isoform X1 contains a series of 26 repeats, which vary in sequence structure and length. Out of the 26 identified repeat sequences, 14 sequences consisted of 20 amino acids, while 5 of the repeats consisted of 21 amino acids, 3 repeats consisted of 22 amino acids, and 4 repeats were 23 amino acids long. Each repeat sequence beings with either the amino acid methionine, isoleucine, or leucine. The main sequence structure of the amino acids within the 26 repeats is MLLLSTGCSSSPPDAPPLHQ. An alignment of the 26 repeats indicate that the most conserved part of the repeat sequence occurs in the middle of the sequences with a triplet of the amino acid serine.

Domains and motifs 
C13orf46 Isoform X1 has a predicted a dimerization domain between amino acids residues 69 to 87.

Regulation and post translational modification 
C13orf46 Isoform X1 is predicted to undergo several post-translational modifications such as phosphorylation, O-GlcNAcylation, mucin type GalNAc O-glycosylation, palmitoylation, and sumoylation. The human C13orf46 Isoform X1 protein also has 11 predicted PPBD-specific binding phosphosites. The most conserved phosphorylation sites occur on the third serine of 23 out of 26 repeats. PKC, PKG, PKA, p38MAPK, GSK3, DNAPK, CKI, cdk5, CKII, and cdc2 are kinases predicted to bind and phosphorylate the human C13orf46 Isoform X1 protein. Predicted phosphorylated sites are also predicted to be sites where O-glycosylation can occur.

Protein interactions 
C13orf46 protein isoform X1 has several predicted S-phase cyclin binding sites, in addition to MAPK and p38 interacting motifs.

Expression 
RNA sequencing shows the expression of C13orf46 is most observed in the lungs, prostate, pancreas, and stomach at intermediate levels. C13orf46 also has lower expression levels in the bone marrow, spleen, thyroid, lymph node, gall bladder, and thymus.

Cellular localization 
C13orf46 Isoform 1 is predicted to be mostly localized within the nucleus. This protein isoform may also be localized on the cell membrane. C13orf46 Isoform X1 is predicted to be mostly localized within the nucleus or cytoplasm.

Homology

Orthologs 
The C13orf46 gene has orthologs to the human C13orf46 isoform 1 protein and C13orf46 isoform X1 protein, found within primates, mammals, birds, reptiles, fish, and invertebrates.

Isoform 1 
Orthologs to the human C13orf46 isoform 1 protein are only known to be found in primates and mammals, suggesting that this part of the C13orf46 gene encoding the C13orf46 isoform 1 protein appeared around 99 million years ago.

Isoform X1 
Predicted orthologs to the human C13orf46 isoform X1 protein are found in primates, mammals, birds, reptiles, fish, and as far as back as invertebrates of the bacterial phylum Legionella.

Paralogs 
Human C13orf46 isoform X1 protein has one predicted paralog among mucins, specifically mucin-1. Mucins play a role in creating protective mucus barriers on epithelial tissues. The MUC1 gene is located on chromosome 1 at 1q22, contains 11 exons, and has 22 different isoforms. Mucins are highly O-glycosylated and contain tandem repeat domains abundant with proline, serine, and threonine. Surrounding the repeat domains are cysteine rich regions. Mucin genes do not always share a common ancestry, are prone to convergent evolution, and are grouped based on their functionality instead of common evolutionary history.

References